The UR MS class, known later as the KUR MS class, later still as the KUR EE class, and finally as the EAR 10 class, was a class of  gauge  steam locomotives built by Nasmyth, Wilson and Company in Patricroft, Salford, England, for the Uganda Railway (UR).

Service history
The eight members of the class entered service on the UR as its MS class in 1913–14. The UR acquired them to carry out shunting and light traffic duties on its branch lines.  All members of the class continued in service after the UR was renamed the Kenya-Uganda Railway (KUR) in 1926, and were reclassified in 1929 as the KUR EE class.

In 1949, they became part of the fleet of the KUR's successor, the East African Railways (EAR).  The EAR later reclassified them as its 10 class; they were withdrawn in the 1960s.

Preservation
One member of the class, no. 1003, has been preserved, and is on static display at Jamhuri Park in Nairobi.

See also
Rail transport in Kenya
Rail transport in Uganda

References

Notes

Bibliography

Kenya-Uganda Railway locomotives
Metre gauge steam locomotives
Nasmyth, Wilson and Company locomotives
Railway locomotives introduced in 1913
Steam locomotives of Kenya
Steam locomotives of Uganda
Uganda Railway locomotives
2-6-4T locomotives